The Rock of Oëtre is situated in the middle of Norman Switzerland, in the commune of Saint-Philbert-sur-Orne, not far from the border between the départements of Calvados and Orne, and almost equidistant from Thury-Harcourt and Écouché. It is one of the most prestigious lookouts in the west of France.

Geology

The reputation of this precipice is founded on its breathtaking sheer drop: . Neither tourists nor locals expect this kind of natural feature in Normandy. It is considered the most mountainous part of the region, even though not the highest, and it has become, over time, one of the main attractions in Normandy. It is also a popular lookout that gives a broad survey of the wooded groves of the Rouvre, the fast-flowing river in the valley, which can be reached by steps hewn from the rock. The natural surroundings are full with granite rocks, ravines, heath and thicket. Many visitors come to find a calm place for their contemplation and meditation.

This figure has been characterised as being many different people. One can argue whether it is the rock that forged the character of people over generations, or conversely if the people came to permeate it with the spirit of their nature. The surrounding area served as a natural hiding place for outlaws of all kinds: the "Fairy's Cave" was one of the most secure hiding places for Chouans and highwaymen.

The rock stands proud proof that the Basse-Normandie region is Armorican, at least in its western half. The Armorican Massif does not stop at the border with Brittany, the neighbouring region, but extends to the départment of Manche, south-west of Calvados and west of Orne. Norman Switzerland is at the eastern end of the Armorican Massif, with the Rock at its centre.

Natural history
Thanks to the environmental awareness of the Orne département, the Rock of Oëtre harbours numerous species of plants and animals rare in France: the spring spergula or spurrey (small white flower), the European green lizard and many species of lichen. These are very prone to being trampled, so visitors should keep to the marked trails.

Museum 

It offers visitors regional tourist information, a museum, library and shop, and a bar-restaurant.

External links 
 Website of normandie-montagnes.fr (Mountains in Normandie) (in French)
 Norman Switzerland Tourism Office (in French and English, requires JavaScript)
 Description of the Rock, on the website of the General Council of Orne (in French)
 Website of the Maison de la Rivière et du Paysage (Museum of the River and Countryside) (in French)

Oetre
Landforms of Orne
Landforms of Calvados (department)